Marat Safin defeated David Nalbandian in the final, 6–2, 6–4, 6–3 to win the singles tennis title at the 2004 Madrid Open.

Juan Carlos Ferrero was the defending champion, but lost to Luis Horna in the second round.

Seeds
A champion seed is indicated in bold text while text in italics indicates the round in which that seed was eliminated. All sixteen seeds received a bye into the second round.

  Tim Henman (third round)
  Andre Agassi (semifinals)
  Marat Safin (champion)
  David Nalbandian (final)
  Nicolás Massú (second round)
  Juan Carlos Ferrero (second round)
  Joachim Johansson (quarterfinals)
  Tommy Robredo (quarterfinals)
  Andrei Pavel (third round)
  Dominik Hrbatý (second round)
  Jiří Novák (second round)
  Juan Ignacio Chela (second round)
  Rainer Schüttler (second round)
  Vincent Spadea (third round)
  Fernando González (second round)
  Paradorn Srichaphan (third round)

Draw

Finals

Top half

Section 1

Section 2

Bottom half

Section 3

Section 4

References 
 2004 Main Draw
 2004 Qualifying Draw

Singles